The Tilted Terminated Folded Dipole (T²FD, T2FD, or TTFD) or Balanced Termination, Folded Dipole (BTFD) - also known as W3HH antenna - is a general-purpose shortwave antenna developed in the late 1940s by the United States Navy. It performs reasonably well over a broad frequency range, without marked dead spots in terms of either frequency, direction, or angle of radiation above the horizon.

Although inferior in terms of efficiency (at least 30% of the RF power is lost as heat in the resistor ) to antennas specifically designed for given frequency bands, or optimized for directionality, its all-around performance, relatively modest size, low cost, and the fact that it does not require any complicated matching to operate with a standard shortwave transmitter, have made it popular in professional shortwave communications where ERP or gain are not a concern. One example would be clear channel low power HF communications.

History
The history of the T²FD antenna divides conveniently into three different phases: It was first developed for use as a general purpose antenna on Naval ships in the 1940s. The design became public in the 1950s and was adopted by radio amateurs, but then fell out of use with the advent of shorter wavelengths and the widespread adoption of low-impedance transmitters and antenna feeds. Recently, with the advent of multiple new frequency bands which are not even-integer multiples of existing bands’ frequencies, it has started to draw renewed attention from radio amateurs.

Origin
The T²FD antenna was originally developed during WW II at the San Diego naval base for use on ships at sea, where antenna size is limited, but where the radio-frequency ground-plane is spectacularly efficient. The design properties of the antenna make it ideal for use in small spaces at long wavelengths, where the antenna cannot be conveniently aimed in any particular direction, and where the number of antennas is limited, compared to the number of operating frequencies.

Early amateur use
One of the developers of the original Navy antenna, Captain G.L. Countryman, was also an amateur radio enthusiast. He introduced the design to other amateurs at the beginning of the 1950s. It was a popular antenna design during the middle of the 20th century, but fell out of common use during the latter part of the century with the growing popularity of upper HF and VHF frequencies, which required dipole antennas of only 16 feet, or smaller. Another factor contributing to its fall in popularity was the growing fad for low-impedance antenna feeds.

Recent revival
Since the late 1980s, amateur radio operators and hobby shortwave listeners have ‘rediscovered’ this antenna, especially for broadcast receiving and for amateur two-way modes such as Morse code and PSK31 where crude signal strength is not as important as a ‘steady’ signal.

There have also been disputed claims that this antenna is comparatively insensitive to man-made radio interference; if true, that would make the design useful in urban environments, where a low noise floor is often more beneficial than high received signal strength. The T²FD is useful for hidden indoor systems, or where several optimized frequency-specific antennas cannot be accommodated. For example, an indoor antenna only 24 feet long will allow operation on all amateur HF bands above 14 MHz on transmit, and down to 7 MHz on receive.

Construction
A typical T²FD is built as follows, out of two parallel-wire conductors:

 Span near a half-wavelength of the lowest required frequency.
This distance is maintained by a number of insulating dowels.
 At least two dowels at the ends are tied to non-conducting ropes, which in turn are tied to supports.
 The upper and lower ends of the conductors are connected at the ends, by wire sections that follow the end dowels.
 Fed in the middle of the lower conductor, with an impedance in the order of 300 Ω, balanced, through a standard 4:1 balun. This provides an acceptable all-frequency match to commonly available 75 Ω coaxial cable.
 Terminated in the middle of the upper conductor with a 400–480 Ω non-inductive resistor, rated to safely absorb at least  of the applied transmitter power. The resistor absorbs a growing portion of the RF power (either captured from the air or supplied by a transmitter) as the operating frequency nears the lower limit of the design range. The resistor can be built of 10 parallel sets of three 1,600 Ω, 1 W resistors, in series.
 In order to make it roughly omnidirectional, the antenna is ideally strung sloping at an angle of 20–40 degrees from horizontal, but will also function satisfactorily if mounted horizontally, as long as it is pulled-out in a reasonably straight line.

The commercially available B&W AC3-30 and B&W DS1.8-30 antennas vary from the above to cover 3–30 MHz using a 90 foot length with an 18 inch spacing of the wires. The balun is a 16:1 ratio, thereby transforming the 50 Ω (ohm) coax to an 800 Ω feed at the antenna. The resistor load is also 800 Ω, non-inductive. This allows the antenna impedance to swing from 400–1,600 Ω over the frequency range intended and thus keep the SWR at the transmitter 2:1 or lower.

Applications and drawbacks
An antenna such as the one described above is usable for both local and medium-long-distance communication across a frequency range of about 1:6 . For example, an antenna for the lower portion of shortwave (say, 3–18 MHz) will be roughly 33 m (110 feet) long, with conductors spaced 1 m (3.3 feet). For the higher portion of shortwave (5–30 MHz), this antenna will be roughly 20 m (66 feet) long, with a spacing of 60 cm (24 inches). If such long spans cannot be accommodated, smaller antennas will still give adequate receive-only performance down to about half of their lowest design frequency.

Transmit performance, however, degrades rapidly below a certain point. Tests done by J.S. Belrose (1994) showed that though the conventional T²FD length is close to a full-size 80 meter (3.5–4.0 MHz) antenna, the antenna starts to suffer serious signal loss both on transmit and receive below 10 MHz (30 m), with the 80 meter band signals −10 dB down (90% power loss) from a reference dipole at 10 MHz.

As a broadband antenna, the T²FD will normally display a reasonably low standing wave ratio (SWR) across its entire frequency range. However, at some frequencies the antenna feedpoint may be moderately reactive, so the use of an antenna tuner may be needed when using modern solid-state transmitters at anything approaching their rated power output. 

Note that “low SWR” does not mean “high antenna efficiency”. This antenna is not recommended for those wanting to make challenging long-distance signal contacts with limited power (e.g. the U.S. amateur limit of 1,500 W, or the U.K. limit of 400 W). At shortwave frequencies, a dipole cut for the longest used wavelength, fed with ladder line and matched with an antenna tuner, would make better use of the applied power than the T²FD.

Many ready-made commercial versions of the T²FD are available for the professional, military, amateur radio, and hobby listening markets.

References

External links
 
 

Radio frequency antenna types
Antennas (radio)